Cadia may refer to:
 CADIA, the Center for Analysis and Design of Intelligent Agents. A research centre at Reykjavík University.
Cadia, New South Wales, a locality and former private township in Australia; the surrounding area is known as the Cadia Valley.
Cadia (plant), a genus of legumes
Cadia (band), Christian girl band
See also:

 Cadia-Ridgeway Mine, gold/copper mine in Australia
 Cadia Engine House, a heritage listed engine house at Cadia, New South Wales
Cadia Mine railway line, a now dismantled railway line that once ran to Cadia, New South Wales.